The Premier Bank Limited (PBL) is a private commercial bank with its registered office in Banani, Dhaka, Bangladesh. Dr. H. B. M. Iqbal is the Chairman and M. Reazul Karim, FCMA is the current Managing Director & CEO.

History
The Premier Bank Limited is a privately owned commercial bank in Bangladesh. It was incorporated as a banking company on June 10, 1999 under Companies Act 1994 with the brand promise ‘Service First’. The Head Office of The Premier Bank Limited is located at Banani, one of the main commercial and business areas of Dhaka city. The Bank offers a wide range of financial products and services including retail banking, corporate banking, SME banking, and investment banking. Premier Bank has a network of branches throughout Bangladesh, serving both retail and corporate customers. The Bank has a strong focus on providing digital banking services, including internet banking, mobile banking, and ATM services. It has 132 Branches, 63 Sub-branches and 90 ATM booths in Bangladesh as of 28 February 2023. Over the years, Premier Bank has established itself as one of the leading Banks in Bangladesh and is recognized for its commitment to providing quality services and innovative financial solutions to its customers.
Premier Bank also offers financial services such as remittances, foreign exchange, trade finance, and treasury services. The Bank has a strong reputation for its innovative and customer-centric approach and has received numerous awards and recognition for its services.
Premier Bank has a strong commitment to corporate social responsibility and is actively involved in various initiatives that contribute to the social and economic development of the communities in Bangladesh. The Bank supports various educational, health, and environmental programs to bring positive change in Bangladesh.
In recent years, Premier Bank has made significant investments in foreign trade and SME business to enhance its banking services and improve the customer experience. The Bank has a modern and efficient IT infrastructure that enables it to offer fast, secure, and convenient banking services to its customers. With its strong focus on innovation and customer satisfaction, Premier Bank is well-positioned to continue its growth and success in the future.

Dr. H. B. M. Iqbal, former Member of Parliament and Chairman of Parliamentary Standing Committee of Ministry of Science and Technology, is the Chairman of The Premier Bank Limited. He was a freedom fighter during Liberation War of Bangladesh in 1971. He has a diverse range of business interests in the field of Banking, Hotels & Resorts, Manufacturing, Cement, Distribution House, Aviation, Medical Centre, Education, Service Sector and Restaurant. He is also the Chairman of the Executive Committee of the Board of Directors of The Premier Bank Limited.

Mr. M. Reazul Karim, FCMA has been reappointed as Managing Director & CEO of The Premier Bank Limited on 23rd April, 2021 for the next three years term. He has been in this position since 23rd April, 2018. Mr. Karim started his banking career with National Bank Limited in 1984. Afterwards, he served Prime Bank Limited and prior to joining The Premier Bank Limited he was Additional Managing Director of Prime Bank Limited. In his 36 years professional career Mr. Karim served at different capacities and roles in National Bank Limited, Prime Bank Limited and The Premier Bank Limited. Mr. M. Reazul Karim has got exposure in branch banking and he also held the key positions like CFO, CRO, CBO of Prime Bank Limited in his 17 years career in that Bank. He attended in various training, seminars and workshops on banking at home and abroad. Mr. Karim completed his post-graduation from University of Dhaka with Honours in Accounting.

References

Banks established in 1999
Banks of Bangladesh
Companies listed on the Dhaka Stock Exchange
Companies listed on the Chittagong Stock Exchange
Banks of Bangladesh with Islamic banking services
1999 establishments in Bangladesh